The Heavyweight competition was the second-highest weight class featured at the 2011 World Amateur Boxing Championships, held at the Heydar Aliyev Sports and Exhibition Complex.

Medalists

Seeds

  Artur Beterbiyev (quarterfinals)
  Bahram Muzaffer (second round)
  Teymur Mammadov (runner-up)
  Ludovic Groguhe (second round)
  Julio Castillo (third round)
  Kenny Egan (second round)
  Romarick Ngoula (second round)
  Oleksandr Usyk (champion)  Tervel Pulev (third round)  Wang Xuanxuan (semifinals)''

Draw

Finals

Top Half

Section 1

Section 2

Bottom Half

Section 3

Section 4

External links
Draw

Heavyweight